Some Kind of Strange is the fifth studio album by Collide, released on April 22, 2003 by Noiseplus Music.

Reception
In Music We Trust said the band "churns out a heady cacophony of futuristic and mechanized sounds powered by distorted guitars, robotic rhythms and bigger-than-life synthesized symphonics, and then caps off the beautiful mess with the super-sensual, threatening purrs and dangerous coos of Collide's vampy vocalist"

Track listing

Personnel
Adapted from the Some Kind of Strange liner notes.

Collide
 Eric Anest (as Statik) – noises, production, engineering, mixing, cover art, illustrations, photography, design
 Karin Johnston (as Tripp9) – vocals, cover art, illustrations, photography, design

Additional performers
 Kevin Crompton (as cEvin Key) – live drums (2)
 Dave Keffer – electric guitar (4), illustrations
 Kevin Kipnis – electric guitar (4, 10), additional acoustic guitar and additional guitar (2)
 Gilbert Levy – live percussion (4, 8, 9)
 Rogerio Silva – additional acoustic guitar and electric guitar (2, 7, 8), acoustic guitar (3, 5), guitar (9, 10)

Production and design
 Mark Walk – drum engineer
 Chad Michael Ward – cover art, illustrations, design
 X-8 – illustrations

Release history

References

External links 
 Some Kind of Strange at collide.net
 
 Some Kind of Strange at Bandcamp
 Some Kind of Strange at iTunes

Collide (band) albums
2003 albums